Ramlal Ghasia was an Indian politician from the state of the Madhya Pradesh.
He represented Mungeli Vidhan Sabha constituency of undivided Madhya Pradesh Legislative Assembly by winning the 1957 Madhya Pradesh Legislative Assembly election.

References 

People from Madhya Pradesh
Madhya Pradesh MLAs 1957–1962
People from Mungeli district
Year of birth missing
Year of death missing